Oreoleuciscus dsapchynensis is a species of cyprinid in the genus Oreoleuciscus.

References

Cyprinid fish of Asia
Fish of Mongolia
Fish described in 1889